The 1910–11 Prima Categoria season was won by Pro Vercelli.

Regulation
The quality committee accepted a third Turinese club, Piedmont FC.

The FIGC organized a test group in the Northeast with four clubs.

Main tournament

Classification

Results table

Veneto-Emilia test group

Classification

Results table

Final
Played on June 11 and 18.

References and sources
Almanacco Illustrato del Calcio - La Storia 1898-2004, Panini Edizioni, Modena, September 2005

Notes

1910-11
Italy